Wichita is a 1955 American CinemaScope Western film directed by Jacques Tourneur and starring Joel McCrea as Wyatt Earp. The film won a Golden Globe Award for Best Outdoor Drama.  The supporting cast features Vera Miles, Lloyd Bridges, Edgar Buchanan, Peter Graves, Jack Elam and Mae Clarke. The film's premiere was held in Wichita, Kansas, at The Wichita Theatre, 310 East Douglas, with the stars in attendance. Vera Miles had been Miss Kansas in 1948 and was third runner up in the Miss America pageant. The Hollywood Foreign Press Association awarded the film with "Best Picture - Outdoor Drama" in 1955.

It was mostly filmed in California, including in Thousand Oaks, CA.

Plot
Former bison hunter and entrepreneur Wyatt Earp (Joel McCrea) arrives in the lawless cattle town of Wichita, Kansas. His skills as a gunfighter make him a perfect candidate for marshal but he refuses the job until he feels morally obligated to bring law and order to this wild town. His least popular move is to take away the guns of everyone in town, no matter how important. Only when town banker Sam McCoy (Walter Coy) is hit with a personal tragedy does Earp's no-guns edict begin to make sense.

Cast
 Joel McCrea as Wyatt Earp
 Vera Miles as Laurie McCoy
 Lloyd Bridges as Gyp Clements
 Wallace Ford as Arthur Whiteside
 Edgar Buchanan as Doc Black
 Peter Graves as Morgan Earp 
 Keith Larsen as Bat Masterson
 Carl Benton Reid as Mayor Andrew Hoke
 John Smith as Jim Earp
 Walter Coy as Sam McCoy
 Robert J. Wilke as Ben Thompson (as Robert Wilke)
 Jack Elam as Al 
 Mae Clarke as Mrs. McCoy
 Walter Sande as Clint Wallace

See also
List of American films of 1955

References

External links 
 
 
 
 
 Richard Brody. Movie of the Week: Wichita The New Yorker (Nov. 12, 2014).

1955 films
1955 Western (genre) films
1950s English-language films
CinemaScope films
Films directed by Jacques Tourneur
Films produced by Walter Mirisch
American Western (genre) films
Cultural depictions of Wyatt Earp
Cultural depictions of Bat Masterson
Films scored by Hans J. Salter
1950s American films